The 2019 Columbian Dyip season was the fifth season of the franchise in the Philippine Basketball Association (PBA).

Draft picks

Roster

Philippine Cup

Eliminations

Standings

Game log

|-bgcolor=ccffcc
| 1
| January 18
| San Miguel
| W 124–118
| CJ Perez (26)
| Jackson Corpuz (11)
| Rashawn McCarthy (6)
| Cuneta Astrodome
| 1–0
|-bgcolor=ffcccc
| 2
| January 23
| Phoenix
| L 98–108
| JP Calvo (18)
| Perez, Reyes (8)
| CJ Perez (6)
| Smart Araneta Coliseum
| 1–1
|-bgcolor=ccffcc
| 3
| January 25
| NorthPort
| W 110–100
| Celda, Corpuz, Faundo (15)
| Jackson Corpuz (8)
| Rashawn McCarthy (12)
| Ynares Center
| 2–1
|-bgcolor=ffcccc
| 4
| January 27
| NLEX
| L 97–107
| Jay-R Reyes (17)
| CJ Perez (11)
| CJ Perez (5)
| Smart Araneta Coliseum
| 2–2

|-bgcolor=ffcccc
| 5
| February 2
| Barangay Ginebra
| L 85–97
| CJ Perez (25)
| CJ Perez (7)
| JP Calvo (5)
| Ynares Center
| 2–3
|-bgcolor=ffcccc
| 6
| February 6
| Alaska
| L 72–94
| CJ Perez (15)
| Calvo, Corpuz, McCarthy (6)
| Rashawn McCarthy (5)
| Mall of Asia Arena
| 2–4
|-bgcolor=ccffcc
| 7
| February 27
| Meralco
| W 86–85
| Rashawn McCarthy (30)
| Rashawn McCarthy (8)
| JP Calvo (4)
| Smart Araneta Coliseum
| 3–4

|-bgcolor=ffcccc
| 8
| March 1
| Blackwater
| L 100–106
| CJ Perez (22)
| CJ Perez (8)
| Rashawn McCarthy (7)
| Mall of Asia Arena
| 3–5
|-bgcolor=ccffcc
| 9
| March 6
| Rain or Shine
| W 85–82
| Rashawn McCarthy (22)
| CJ Perez (11)
| JP Calvo (8)
| Smart Araneta Coliseum
| 4–5
|-bgcolor=ffcccc
| 10
| March 13
| Magnolia
| L 83–109
| Rashawn McCarthy (19)
| Jackson Corpuz (11)
| Rashawn McCarthy (3)
| Smart Araneta Coliseum
| 4–6
|-bgcolor=ffcccc
| 11
| March 22
| TNT
| L 98–101
| CJ Perez (22)
| Perez, Reyes (9)
| CJ Perez (5)
| Ynares Center
| 4–7

Commissioner's Cup

Eliminations

Standings

Game log

|-bgcolor=ffcccc
| 1
| May 19
| Alaska
| L 98–111
| Kyle Barone (30)
| Kyle Barone (22)
| JP Calvo (7)
| Mall of Asia Arena
| 0–1
|-bgcolor=ffcccc
| 2
| May 24
| Meralco
| L 92–101
| Kyle Barone (26)
| Kyle Barone (16)
| Rashawn McCarthy (7)
| Smart Araneta Coliseum
| 0–2
|-bgcolor=ffcccc
| 3
| May 26
| Blackwater
| L 110–118
| Kyle Barone (21)
| Kyle Barone (14)
| Rashawn McCarthy (6)
| Smart Araneta Coliseum
| 0–3

|-bgcolor=ccffcc
| 4
| June 1
| NLEX
| W 120–105
| CJ Perez (39)
| CJ Perez (9)
| JP Calvo (9)
| Mall of Asia Arena
| 1–3
|-bgcolor=ffcccc
| 5
| June 16
| Magnolia
| L 103–110
| Lester Prosper (26)
| Lester Prosper (14)
| Rashawn McCarthy (4)
| Smart Araneta Coliseum
| 1–4
|-bgcolor=ffcccc
| 6
| June 21
| TNT
| L 102–109
| Lester Prosper (37)
| Lester Prosper (20)
| CJ Perez (7)
| Cuneta Astrodome
| 1–5
|-bgcolor=ffcccc
| 7
| June 23
| Rain or Shine
| L 86–88 (OT)
| Lester Prosper (26)
| Lester Prosper (15)
| CJ Perez (6)
| Batangas City Coliseum
| 1–6
|-bgcolor=ccffcc
| 8
| June 30
| San Miguel
| W 134–132 (OT)
| Lester Prosper (40)
| Lester Prosper (13)
| Rashawn McCarthy (14)
| Smart Araneta Coliseum
| 2–6

|-bgcolor=ffcccc
| 9
| July 3
| NorthPort
| L 108–110
| Lester Prosper (36)
| Lester Prosper (17)
| CJ Perez (6)
| Smart Araneta Coliseum
| 2–7
|-bgcolor=ccffcc
| 10
| July 6
| Phoenix
| W 100–98
| Lester Prosper (25)
| Lester Prosper (21)
| Reden Celda (8)
| Mall of Asia Arena
| 3–7
|-bgcolor=ffcccc
| 11
| July 14
| Barangay Ginebra
| L 123–127 (OT)
| Lester Prosper (45)
| Lester Prosper (18)
| Rashawn McCarthy (11)
| Smart Araneta Coliseum
| 3–8

Governors' Cup

Eliminations

Standings

Game log

|-bgcolor=ccffcc
| 1
| September 20
| Alaska
| W 117–110
| Khapri Alston (38)
| Khapri Alston (22)
| Alston, Tiongson (4)
| Mall of Asia Arena
| 1–0
|-bgcolor=ffcccc
| 2
| September 22
| Rain or Shine
| L 90–96
| Khapri Alston (23)
| Khapri Alston (15)
| Khapri Alston (5)
| Smart Araneta Coliseum
| 1–1

|-bgcolor=ccffcc
| 3
| October 2
| NorthPort
| W 114–108
| CJ Perez (26)
| Khapri Alston (17)
| CJ Perez (6)
| Smart Araneta Coliseum
| 2–1
|-bgcolor=ffcccc
| 4
| October 5
| TNT 
| L 120–125 
| Khapri Alston (38) 
| Khapri Alston (13) 
| Rashawn McCarthy (5) 
| Ynares Center 
| 2–2
|-bgcolor=ccffcc
| 5
| October 11
| Blackwater
| W 102–90
| Rashawn McCarthy (25)
| Khapri Alston (20)
| CJ Perez (6)
| Mall of Asia Arena
| 3–2
|-bgcolor=ffcccc
| 6
| October 16
| NLEX 
| L 111–117 
| CJ Perez (21) 
| Khapri Alston (17) 
| Alston, Celda (7) 
| Ynares Center 
| 3–3
|-bgcolor=ffcccc
| 7
| October 20
| San Miguel
| L 107–113
| Khapri Alston (38)
| Khapri Alston (25)
| Rashawn McCarthy (6)
| Smart Araneta Coliseum
| 3–4
|-bgcolor=ccffcc
| 8
| October 25
| Phoenix
| W 106–104
| Khapri Alston (30)
| Khapri Alston (19)
| Rashawn McCarthy (3)
| Smart Araneta Coliseum
| 4–4
|-bgcolor=ffcccc
| 9
| October 27
| Magnolia
| L 103–118
| CJ Perez (28)
| Khapri Alston (14)
| Rashawn McCarthy (6)
| Smart Araneta Coliseum
| 4–5

|-bgcolor=ffcccc
| 10
| November 8
| Meralco
| L 74–92
| CJ Perez (21)
| Khapri Alston (16)
| Rashawn McCarthy (4)
| Smart Araneta Coliseum
| 4–6
|-bgcolor=ffcccc
| 11
| November 15
| Barangay Ginebra
| L 90–113
| Khapri Alston (34)
| Khapri Alston (22)
| CJ Perez (5)
| Smart Araneta Coliseum
| 4–7

Transactions

Trades

Preseason

Rookie signings

Awards

References

Terrafirma Dyip seasons
Columbian Dyip